Lenore Montanaro (born May 30, 1990) is a Rhode Island and Massachusetts attorney, American poet, above-the-knee amputee, three-time cancer survivor, and animal rescue attorney and writer.

Early life 

Montanaro was born on May 30, 1990, in Rhode Island, United States. She was diagnosed in September 1995, with Rhabdomyosarcoma at the age of five and subsequently battled the disease until the loss of her right leg above-the-knee on May 10, 2002. She wears a prosthetic leg and is the first leg amputee to attend and graduate from College of the Holy Cross in Worcester, Massachusetts. She received her Juris Doctor from Western New England University.  While in law school, Montanaro was one of two recipients of a national scholarship competition sponsored by the Defense Research Institute (DRI). Her winning essay contained her detailed opinion of two of the proposed amendments to the Federal Rules of Civil Procedure. On April 26, 2011, Montanaro's younger brother, John F. Montanaro III., died from Acute Lymphoblastic Leukemia.

Legal career
Montanaro passed the Bar Exam in Rhode Island and Massachusetts. She is the Director of Advocacy for the Animal Rescue League of Boston, one of the oldest animal protection organizations in the United States.

Literary career
Montanaro began writing poetry after the loss of her leg. Her literary influences include Ralph Waldo Emerson, Henry David Thoreau, Elizabeth Bishop, Robert K. Cording, and Rainer Maria Rilke. She has published her first book of poetry, The Morning within the Dark. A vision of understanding of death and dying is the subject of her poems.

Writing style 
Montanaro often writes about suffering and loss. Many of her poems detail one's experience with cancer and dying as viewed in an excerpt to her poem, titled, Sunglasses:

Her poem, "This Camp," was selected for the anthology The Cancer Poetry Project 2 that was released in 2013. Montanaro is working on her next book of poems.

References 

1990 births
American women poets
College of the Holy Cross alumni
Living people
21st-century American poets
21st-century American women writers